Tasmin is a female given name.

People with the name Tasmin include:
 Tasmin Archer (born 1963), English pop singer
 Tasmin Little (born 1965), English classical violinist
 Tasmin Lucia-Khan (born 1980), British journalist and news presenter
 Tasmin McMahon (born 1993), Australian long-distance runner
 Tasmin Mahfuz (born 1987), American television journalist and news anchor
 Tasmin Mitchell (born 1986), American basketball player and coach
 Tasmin Pepper (born 1990), South African racing driver
 Tasmin Rana, Bangladeshi politician

See also 
 Tamsin (disambiguation)
 TVR Tasmin, British sports car